In New York, The Bellmores collectively refers to:
 Bellmore, New York
 North Bellmore, New York